Kamil Yashin (birth name Nugmanov) (1909-1997) was a Soviet-Uzbekistani poet, screenwriter, and celebrity.  He was awarded the titles People's Writer of the Uzbek SSR in 1959, Hero of Socialist Labor in 1974, and the USSR State Prize in 1951.

Early life 
Yashin was born in Andijan, Russian Turkestan.  After graduating high school he studied at the Leningrad Forestry Institute but was forced to return to the Uzbek SSR after studying for three years due to illness.  For several years he taught literature and physics at a secondary school in Andijan.  From 1930 to 1936 Yashin was in charge of the literary department of the Uzbek State Musical Theater.  During that time he wrote the plays including "Comrades" in 1930,  "Burn" in 1931, "Honor and Love" in 1935, and co-authored the musical drama "Gulsara" in 1935 with Muzaffar Muhamedov.

Career and writings 
Yashin, who had met the famous poet Hamza Niyazi several times, was tremendously affected by his writings and violent death; Hamza was the subject of several of Yashin's works.

In the years leading up to World War II Yashin wrote librettos for the first national operas in the Uzbek SSR, "Boʻron" and "Ulugʻ kanal". After the brutal honor killing Nurkhon Yuldashkhojayeva, of one of the first Uzbek women to perform on the stage without the veil, Yashin wrote the musical "Nurkhon" detailing her life and death as that of a brave martyr of the women's liberation. Nurkhon's murder was not the only honor-killing of a celebrity of the stage in the Hujum era, with the earlier murder of Tursunoi Saidazmova, the famed "Uzbek nightingale" known for her singing. Yashin had been friends with screenwriter Hamza Niyazi who was stoned to death in Shohimardon by Islamists after he had written works critical of Islam and supportive of women's rights. Yashin later wrote the musical "Hamza" dedicated to his life and efforts against superstition that eventually led to his brutal murder. Other musicals Yashin wrote included "Nomus va Muhabbat",  "Oʻlim bosqinchilarga" (1942), "Davron ota" (1942, co-author), "Farod va Shirin" (1944) and "Oftobxon" (1944), some of which were created for Soviet troops in the Second World War, usually referred to in the Soviet Union as the Great Patriotic War.  After the war he wrote the scripts for the plays "General Rakhimov" (1949), "Ravshan va Zulxumor" (1956), "Secret under the Paranja", and "Dawn of the Revolution" (1972).

He later directed a documentary film on the life of Hamza Hakimzade Niyazi, of whom he also published a novel about, served as editor-in-chief of the magazine Uzbek Tili va Adabyti (Uzbek language and literature) and was a member of the Communist Party of the Soviet Union.

There are streets bearing his name in Tashkent and Andijan.

Awards and honors 
 Hero of Socialist Labor (27 September 1974)
 Three Orders of Lenin (18 March 1959; 16 January 1970; 27 September 1974)
 Order of the October Revolution (29 December 1979)
 Three Orders of the Red Banner of Labor (16 January 1950; 6 December 1951; 1 March 1965)
 Order of Friendship of Peoples (16 November 1984)
 Order of the Badge of Honor (31 May 1937; 24 March 1945; 11 January 1957)
 People's Writer of the Uzbek SSR (1969)
 Honored Artist of the Uzbek SSR (1939)
 The Stalin Prize in the third class (1951)
 State Hamza Prize (1958)

References 

1909 births
1997 deaths
Uzbekistani writers
People from Andijan
Soviet dramatists and playwrights
Communist Party of the Soviet Union members
Heroes of Socialist Labour
Recipients of the USSR State Prize